Plate is a municipality  in the Ludwigslust-Parchim district, in Mecklenburg-Vorpommern, Germany.

References

See also
List of municipalities in Germany
Towns in Mecklenburg-Vorpommern

Ludwigslust-Parchim
Grand Duchy of Mecklenburg-Schwerin